The women's speed competition in sport climbing at the 2017 World Games took place on 22 July 2017 at the Nowy Targ Square in Wrocław, Poland.

Competition format
A total of 12 athletes entered the competition. In qualification every athlete has 2 runs, best time counts. Top 8 climbers qualify to main competition.

Results

Qualifications

Competition bracket

References 

 
2017 World Games